Basketball was one of the disciplines which was held at the 1997 West Asian Games in Tehran, Iran. Because of some last minute withdrawals, only two teams were left for the competition, Iran and Turkmenistan. Two other Iranian teams were added to the competition but they didn't receive medals. Only gold and silver medals were awarded. Iran beat Turkmenistan in the final to win the gold medal.

Results

Semifinals

Third place

Final

References

Official website

West Asian Games
1997 West Asian Games
1997 West Asian Games
1997